Rahmatullah Kairanawi (also known as Rahmatullah Kairanawi Al-Hindi; 1818–1891) was a Sunni Muslim scholar and author who is best known for his work, Izhar ul-Haqq.

Background
Kairanawi was born in Kairana, Muzaffarnagar in 1818. He is a descendant of the third Caliph, Uthman ibn Affan, his full lineage is mentioned in family sources. Part of the family wealth, a large property in Kairana, was granted by Akbar the Great. Many family members held high positions and/or were intellectuals. Sheikh Hakeem Abdul Kareem who was an 8th great grandfather of Rahmatullah was the Emperor Akbar's physician. Kairanwi began receiving traditional Islamic education at the age of 6, memorizing the Qur'an at 12. He also learned Arabic and Persian. Later he moved to Delhi where he studied different disciplines including mathematics and medicine. Working as a Mufti and Sharia teacher, he founded a religious school in Kariana.

Name and lineage
His ism (given name) was Rahmatullāh. His nasab (patronymic) is: Rahmatullāh ibn Khalīlullāh ibn Najībullāh ibn Habībullāh ibn Abd al-Rahīm ibn Qutb al-Dīn ibn Fuzail ibn Abd al-Rahīm ibn Abd al-Karīm ibn Hasan ibn Abd al-Samad ibn Abu Ali ibn Muhammad Yūsuf ibn Abd al-Qādir ibn Jalāluddīn Muhammad ibn Mahmūd ibn Yaqūb ibn Īsā ibn Ismā'īl ibn Muhammad Taqi ibn Abī Bakr ibn Ali Naqi ibn Usmān ibn Abdullāh ibn Shihābuddīn ibn Abd al-Rahmān Gāzrūni ibn Abd al-Azīz Sarkhasi ibn Khālid ibn Walīd ibn Abd al-Azīz ibn Abd al-Rahmān ibn Abdullāh Sāni ibn Abd al-Azīz ibn Abdullāh Kabīr ibn Amar ibn Uthman.

Debate with Pfander
In 1837 the Church Mission Society appointed Karl Gottlieb Pfander, described by Eugene Stock as "perhaps the greatest of all missionaries to Mohammedans", to Agra in Northern India, where in 1854 he engaged in a famous public debate with leading Islamic scholars. The main Muslim debater was Kairanawi, being assisted by English-speaking Muhammad Wazîr Khân and influential Islamic writer Imad ud-din Lahiz. Kairanawi used arguments from recent European theologically critical works that Pfander was unfamiliar with, having left Europe before these were published, though his main source of reference was the apocryphal sixteenth-century Gospel of Barnabas, which he held to be authentic.

Indian Rebellion of 1857 
Following armed uprisings against the British in which he personally took part, Kairanawani (his property was confiscated by the Imperial British Raj) had to leave all his property (auctioned later), and board a ship in Bombay. Arriving at the port of Mocha, Yemen, he walked to Mecca. The journey took two years.

Author
Kairanawi wrote books in Arabic, Persian and Urdu.

Izhar ul-Haq (Truth Revealed)
Written originally in Arabic, the book Izhar ul-Haqq in six volumes was translated later into Urdu, and from Urdu into a summarized English version published by Ta-Ha. The book aims to respond to Christian criticism of Islam. It is the first Muslim book to use Western scholarly works in order to ascertain the errors and contradictions of the Bible. The doctrine of Trinity is purportedly contested using biblical, Christian and other sources. Christine Schirrmacher, a German scholar of Islamic Studies, states in an article on the Pfander-Kairanawi debate: "The Demonstration of the Truth' (izhâr al-haqq) served as a summary of all possible charges against Christianity and was therefore used after al-Kairânawî's death as a sort of encyclopaedia since al-Kairânawî extended the material of former polemicists like 'Ali Tabarî, Ibn Hazm or Ibn Taymiyya to a great extent."

The Madrasa Sawlatia
While residing in Mecca, Kairanawi founded a religious school there named Madrasah as-Sawlatiyah. Rahmatullah Kairanawi was appointed as a lecturer at the Masjid-e-Haram by the Sheikh-ul-Ulama (The Leading Scholar) Sheikh Ahmad Dahlan As-Shafiee. Kairanawi started teaching and realized that lessons were delivered as sermons, rather than, planned academic lectures. He gathered some of the Indian Muslim immigrants, wealthy benefactors to establish an authentic Islamic Law School to teach the Islamic sciences through a sound curriculum. He established the Madrassah in 1290 hijrah corresponding to 1874 A.D. The major contributor was a lady of Calcutta by the name of Sawlat-un-Nisa, on whose name the Madrassah is named. The Madrassah is still in existence and has well known alumni around the world.       Madrasah as-Sawlatiyah.

Death
Kairanwi died in 1891 (22 Ramadan 1308 AH) in Mecca and was buried in Jannat al-Mu'alla.

See also
 Karl Gottlieb Pfander – Bibliography
 Pfander Vs Rahmatullah debate
 Ahmed Deedat

References

Bibliography
مولانا رحمت اللہ کیرانوی کی علمی و دینی خدمات کا تحقیقی جائزہ
 

Hanafis
Maturidis
19th-century Muslim theologians
Sunni Sufis
Scholars from Uttar Pradesh
Indian Sunni Muslim scholars of Islam
19th-century Indian non-fiction writers
1818 births
1891 deaths
Critics of Christianity
Burials at Jannat al-Mu'alla
People from Shamli district